Ercan Muslu (born 1 December 1988 in Sungurbeyli, Gümüşhane) is a long-distance runner from Turkey competing in marathon and mountain running.

He was born in 1988 in Sungurbeyli village (formerly Kuşyuva) of Gümüşhane. After completing the Commerce Vocational High School for Commerce in his hometown, he attended Erciyes University in Kayseri, where he is studying Physical Education and Sports.

In 2012, he became gold medalist in the marathon event at the Balkan Championship in Belgrade, Serbia. The same year, he took the bronze medal at the Balkan Mountain Running Champşonships on June 7 in Nova Zagora, Bulgaria. At the 2012 European Mountain Running Championships held on July 7 in Denizli, Turkey, Muslu won the silver medal after six-time gold medalist Ahmet Arslan.

Achievements

References

1988 births
Living people
Sportspeople from Gümüşhane
Erciyes University alumni
Turkish male long-distance runners
Turkish male marathon runners
Turkish mountain runners
Athletes (track and field) at the 2016 Summer Olympics
Olympic athletes of Turkey